Maximiliano Rodríguez Maeso (born 2 October 1990) is an Uruguayan professional footballer who plays as an attacking midfielder.

Career
Born in Montevideo, Rodríguez finished his formation with local Montevideo Wanderers. He made his professional debut on 23 August 2009, against Peñarol, and scored his first professional goal on 24 January 2010 against the same team.

In 2012–13 season, Rodríguez scored 15 goals in only 22 appearances (9 in Apertura and 6 in Clausura). On 10 May 2013, he was signed a four-year deal with Grêmio.

On 6 July Rodríguez made his Campeonato Brasileiro Série A debut, in a 1–1 away draw against Atlético-PR. He appeared regularly during the campaign, scoring four goals in 18 matches; highlights in a match against Náutico on 11 September, where he applied three subsequent nutmegs in Jean Rolt, and also assisted Paulinho in the last of the 2–0 away success.

In August 2014, after only appearing sparingly during the year, Rodríguez was loaned to Vasco da Gama until December. He returned to Tricolor after appearing regularly for the former, which won promotion back to the top division at first attempt.

On 5 January 2015 Rodríguez joined Universidad de Chile, also in a temporary deal.

References

External links
Maxi Rodríguez profile. Portal Oficial do Grêmio.

1990 births
Living people
Footballers from Montevideo
Uruguayan footballers
Uruguayan expatriate footballers
Association football midfielders
Pan American Games medalists in football
Pan American Games bronze medalists for Uruguay
Footballers at the 2011 Pan American Games
Medalists at the 2011 Pan American Games
Uruguayan Primera División players
Uruguayan Segunda División players
Campeonato Brasileiro Série A players
Campeonato Brasileiro Série B players
Argentine Primera División players
Primera Nacional players
Chilean Primera División players
Montevideo Wanderers F.C. players
Peñarol players
Grêmio Foot-Ball Porto Alegrense players
CR Vasco da Gama players
Universidad de Chile footballers
San Luis de Quillota footballers
San Martín de San Juan footballers
Club Atlético Tigre footballers
Villa Teresa players
Paraná Clube players
Esporte Clube São José players
Uruguayan expatriate sportspeople in Brazil
Uruguayan expatriate sportspeople in Chile
Uruguayan expatriate sportspeople in Argentina
Expatriate footballers in Brazil
Expatriate footballers in Chile
Expatriate footballers in Argentina